Gerard Napier may refer to:

Sir Gerard Napier, 1st Baronet, MP for Wareham and Weymoth and Melcombe Regis
Gerard Napier (MP for Dorchester)